The Horizon League Softball Championship is the conference softball tournament of the NCAA Division I Horizon League in college softball.  The four team double-elimination tournament is held at the home field of the regular season winner.  In 2021, UIC won the title for the 10th time, most in conference history.

The winner of the tournament receives an automatic berth to the NCAA Division I softball championship.

Champions

By year

By school

Italics indicates school no longer sponsors softball in the Horizon League.

References